The 2011 FIA WTCC Race of Portugal was the sixth round of the 2011 World Touring Car Championship season and the fifth running of the FIA WTCC Race of Portugal. It was held on 3 July 2011 at the Circuito da Boavista street circuit in Porto, Portugal.

Both races were won by Chevrolet RML with Alain Menu winning race one and Robert Huff winning race two.

Background
Coming into the round, Robert Huff was leading the drivers' championship. Kristian Poulsen was leading the Yokohama Independents' Trophy.

After the Race of the Czech Republic, Urs Sonderegger left the Wiechers-Sport team having struggled to be competitive. His replacement was Stefano D'Aste who had last raced for them in the 2009 season.

Report

Testing and free practice
The works Chevrolet cars finished 1–2–3 in Friday's test session with Huff leading Yvan Muller and Menu. Norbert Michelisz was fourth and the fastest independent driver while fellow BMW driver D'Aste was fifth. The session came to an end prematurely when the Polestar Racing Volvo C30 of Robert Dahlgren collided with the barriers.

Menu led free practice one on Saturday morning, edging out team–mate Muller by less than a tenth of a second. Huff was third while Tom Coronel was fourth for ROAL Motorsport ahead of the local driver Tiago Monteiro.

Chevrolet completed their domination of the testing and practice in free practice two as Huff set the pace ahead of Muller. Gabriele Tarquini was third for Lukoil-SUNRED while Franz Engstler was the fastest independent driver in sixth. Michelisz ended his session early when he collided with one of the barriers, damaging the rear of his Zengő-Dension Team BMW 320 TC and puncturing a tyre.

Qualifying
Menu took his second pole position of the year, leading a Chevrolet 1–2–3 in qualifying. Tarquini had set the pace in the first part of qualifying ahead of Menu and Coronel while D'Aste ended up tenth to claim pole position for race two. Yokohama Trophy leader Poulsen was among those to miss out of the second session, the Liqui Moly Team Engstler driver took too much kerb heading into the final chicane and crashed into the barriers.

Muller set the pace for much of the second session but a quick lap from Menu in the final few minutes put the Swiss driver onto pole position. Muller lined up second with Huff third while Q1 pacesetter Tarquini was fourth. Monteiro was fifth at his home event ahead of Coronel and Dahlgren while eighth went to the top independent driver Michelisz. D'Aste and Engstler completed the top ten.

Aleksei Dudukalo would drop ten places on the grid for race one owing to an unscheduled engine change in his SEAT León 2.0 TDI.

Warm-Up
Championship leader Huff was quickest in Sunday morning's warm–up session ahead of pole sitter Menu.

Race One
Menu led the field away at the rolling start with Muller and Huff behind, Monteiro took fourth after passing Tarquini. Fredy Barth tangled with the diesel SEAT of Dudukalo at the first chicane with Dudukalo retiring on the first lap and Barth stopping on lap three. Muller and Huff spent much of the race battling for second place giving Menu a chance to break away from the pair into a comfortable lead. Javier Villa also retired after an accident at the first chicane, his race ended on lap six. The race saw relatively little action and Menu led a Chevrolet 1–2–3 with Monteiro staying ahead of Tarquini with Coronel sixth and Dahlgren seventh. Michelisz was the Yokohama Trophy winner in eighth after launching an unsuccessful attack on Dahlgren's seventh place, while Michel Nykjær and D'Aste rounded out the top ten.

Race Two
D'Aste was on pole position for the standing start while Dahlgren bogged down and much of the field had to avoid him. The Wiechers–Sport driver led the race until lap three when he was passed by Muller. Muller was able to build a 2.5 second lead while it took Huff another lap to pass D'Aste, after which Huff started to close in on the leading Chevrolet. Huff eventually caught up and the pair came together before Huff skidded over one of the chicanes and into the lead. D'Aste received a drive–through penalty for jumping the start and Monteiro moved into the third when the Italian dived into the pit lane. D'Aste collided with the bollards after a late nudge from Mehdi Bennani. Huff claimed the win ahead of Muller, Monteiro claimed a podium at his home race in third. Michelisz in fourth was the independent winner again while Poulsen, the Yokohama Trophy leader coming into the event, was last on the road.

Results

Qualifying

Bold denotes Pole position for second race.

Race 1

Bold denotes Fastest lap.

Race 2

Bold denotes Fastest lap.

Standings after the event

Drivers' Championship standings

Yokohama Independents' Trophy standings

Manufacturers' Championship standings

 Note: Only the top five positions are included for both sets of drivers' standings.

References

External links
World Touring Car Championship official website

Portugal
Race of Portugal